The Houston Skippers were a minor league ice hockey team based in Houston, Texas.  They were a member of the United States Hockey League, and played for only season, 1946.

Houston was awarded a franchise from the USHL on May 12, 1946.  The team name was chosen in honor of the "skippers" of the boats in the Houston Ship Channel.  The Skippers played their first game on the road on October 26, 1946, and their first home game on November 14, 1946.  Their home ice was at the Sam Houston Coliseum.

The Skippers finished in last place in the 1946 season. Before the start of the 1947 season, the Skippers changed their name to the Houston Huskies.

External links
Hidden History of Houston Hockey

Ice hockey teams in Houston
Defunct ice hockey teams in Texas
1946 establishments in Texas
1947 disestablishments in Texas
Ice hockey clubs established in 1946
Sports clubs disestablished in 1947